Melanie Hall (born 11 January 1977) is a wheelchair basketball player from Australia. She is a paraplegic as a result of a motor vehicle accident. She was part of the bronze medal-winning Australia women's national wheelchair basketball team at the 2008 Summer Paralympics.

References

Paralympic bronze medalists for Australia
Wheelchair category Paralympic competitors
Wheelchair basketball players at the 2008 Summer Paralympics
Paralympic wheelchair basketball players of Australia
1977 births
Living people
Medalists at the 2008 Summer Paralympics
Paralympic medalists in wheelchair basketball
People with paraplegia